Fulgoraria kaoae is a species of sea snail, a marine gastropod mollusk in the family Volutidae, the volutes.

Description
The length of the shell attains 72.8 mm.

Distribution
This marine species occurs off Taiwan.

References

 Bail, P., 2008. A new species of Fulgoraria Schumacher, 1817 (Gastropoda: Volutidae) from the bathyal Taiwanese water. Novapex 9(4): 165-170

Volutidae
Gastropods described in 2008